is a railway station in Iwakuni, Yamaguchi Prefecture, Japan, operated by West Japan Railway Company (JR West) and Nishikigawa Railway.

Lines
Kawanishi Station is served by the Gantoku Line and the Nishikigawa Seiryū Line.

Surroundings
 Kintai Bridge
 Birthplace of the Chiyo Uno

Adjacent stations

|-
!colspan=5|JR West

|-
!colspan=5|Nishikigawa Railway

See also
 List of railway stations in Japan

External links
  

Railway stations in Japan opened in 1960
Railway stations in Yamaguchi Prefecture